The 1968 season was the Chicago Bears' 49th in the National Football League.  The team failed to improve on their 7–6–1 record from 1967 and finished with a  7–7 record under first-year head coach Jim Dooley and earning them a second-place finish in the Central Division within the NFL's Western Conference, a game behind the Minnesota Vikings.

Star running back Gale Sayers tore the ligaments in his right knee against San Francisco on November 10 and was lost for the season.

The Bears had the tiebreaker advantage over Minnesota, after defeating them twice. They needed a win over the Green Bay Packers in the season finale to clinch the division title, but lost by a point at home.

The following season, Chicago posted its worst record in franchise history at 1–13. The Bears' next postseason appearance was in 1977, as a wild card team, and the next division title came in 1984.

Offseason
George Halas, age 73, retired as head coach of the Bears for the fourth and final time on May 27. Dooley, 38, was promoted and introduced as head coach the following day.

NFL/AFL Draft

Roster

Regular season

Schedule

Game summaries

Week 1

Week 2

Week 3

    
    
    
    
    
    
    
    

Gale Sayers 16 Rush, 108 Yds

Week 4

Week 5

Week 6

Week 7

    
    
    
    
    
    
    
    
    
    

Gale Sayers 18 Rush, 143 Yds

Week 8

    
    
    
    
    

Gale Sayers 24 Rush, 205 Yds
Mac Percival booted the game-winning field goal with 16 seconds remaining on a rare free kick following a fair catch.

Standings

References

Chicago Bears
Chicago Bears seasons
Chicago Bears